The 2004–05 NLA season was the 67th regular season of the Nationalliga A, the main professional ice hockey league in Switzerland.

The season started on September 17, 2004, the last League Qualification game was played on April 14, 2005.

Regular season

Final standings

Scoring leaders

Note: GP = Games played; G = Goals; A = Assists; Pts = Points;  PIM = Penalty Minutes

Playoffs

Quarterfinals

Semifinals

{| cellspacing="10" 
| valign="top" |
	
|   
| valign="top" |
	{| cellpadding="3" border="1"  class="wikitable"
	! bgcolor="#DDDDDD" colspan="4" | ZSC Lions vs. EV Zug 
	|-
	! Date !! Away !! Home
	|-
	| March 12 || align = "right" | EV Zug 3 || 1 ZSC Lions || 
	|-
	| March 15 || align = "right" | ZSC Lions 4 || 1 EV Zug || 
	|-
	| March 17 || align = "right" | EV Zug 1 || 4 ZSC Lions || 
	|-
	| March 19 || align = "right" | ZSC Lions 3 || 2 EV Zug || OT
	|- 
	| March 22 || align = "right" | EV Zug 2 || 4 ZSC Lions || 
	|- align="center"
	| colspan="4" | ZSC Lions wins series 4–1'''	|}
|}

Finals

Scoring leadersNote: GP = Games played; G = Goals; A = Assists; Pts = Points;  PIM = Penalty Minutes''

Playout

Semifinals

Finals

League Qualification

Results from Puck.ch
Regular Season 2004-2005
Playoff 2004-2005
Playout 2004-2005
League Qualification 2004-2005

1
Swiss